Rossosh is a town and the administrative center of Rossoshansky District in Voronezh Oblast, Russia. Population:

Administrative and municipal status
Within the framework of administrative divisions, Rossosh serves as the administrative center of Rossoshansky District. As an administrative division, it is incorporated within Rossoshansky District as Rossosh Urban Settlement. As a municipal division, this administrative unit also has urban settlement status and is a part of Rossoshansky Municipal District.

See also
Ostrogozhsk–Rossosh Offensive

References

Notes

Sources

Cities and towns in Voronezh Oblast
Populated places in Rossoshansky District
Ostrogozhsky Uyezd

